Mirage is a 1972 Peruvian drama film directed by Armando Robles Godoy. Robles Godoy wrote the screenplay together with Bernardo Batievsky. It is the only Peruvian film to date to be nominated for a Golden Globe Award.

Plot
A story about a young man who inherits a broken down estate at the edge of the Peruvian desert, with no explanation about the former owners or what had become of the once thriving house. By searching through the rocks and sands for relics, he discovers the answers to the mystery, told in flashback. The film combines the boy's search with other socio-economic issues relevant to Peru in a confusing, but insightful manner.

Cast
 Miguel Angel Flores - Juan
 Helena Rojo - Rina
 Hernán Romero - Father Jorge
 Orlando Sacha - Don Francisco
 Gabriel Figueroa - Professor
 Rómulo León - Gabriel
 Raquel Meneses - María

Awards and nominations
The film was selected as the Peruvian entry for the Best Foreign Language Film at the 45th Academy Awards, but was not accepted as a nominee.

Won
 Cartagena Film Festival
Best Film

 Chicago Film Festival
Best Foreign Language Film

Nominated
 Golden Globe Awards
Best Foreign Film – Foreign Language

See also
 List of submissions to the 45th Academy Awards for Best Foreign Language Film
 List of Peruvian submissions for the Academy Award for Best Foreign Language Film

References

External links
 

1972 films
1972 drama films
Peruvian drama films
1970s Peruvian films
1970s Spanish-language films
Films directed by Armando Robles Godoy